Splendor is a multiplayer card-based board game, designed by Marc André and illustrated by Pascal Quidault. It was published in 2014 by Space Cowboys, Asmodee. Players are gem merchants of the Renaissance, developing gem mines, transportation, and shops to accumulate prestige points. Splendor received positive reviews and received numerous awards, including winner of Golden Geek Best Family Board Game, and nominated for the Spiel des Jahres Game of the Year in 2014. The game also received a mobile application and an expansion released in 2017.

Gameplay 
Splendor is an engine-building and resource management game in which two to four players compete to collect the most prestige points. The game has the following components:

40 gem tokens - seven each of emerald, sapphire, ruby, diamond,onyx, and five gold (wild). These are represented by poker-style chips.
90 development cards
10 noble tiles

Each development card falls into one of three levels (•, ••, •••) indicating the difficulty to purchase that card.

Every development card also contains a gem bonus (emerald, sapphire, ruby, diamond, or onyx), which may be used for future development card purchases.

Before the game begins, n+1 Noble tiles are dealt face up in the center, where n is the number of players. Four cards from each level (•, ••, •••) are dealt face up, visible to the players, and the rest are kept in separate decks of their corresponding difficulty levels.

Turns
A player's turn consists of a single action, which must be one of the following:

Take up to three gem tokens of different colors from the pool.
Take two gem tokens of the same color from the pool (provided there are at least four tokens left of that color).
Take one gold gem token and reserve one development card (if total number of reserved cards held by that player does not exceed three).
Purchase a development card (from the table or the player's reserved cards) by spending the required gem tokens or/and using the gem bonus of the cards purchased previously by the player.

After this action:

 If the player has earned enough development card gems bonus to trigger a Noble points bonus, that player is "visited" by the Noble, and takes that Noble tile.
 A player can only be visited by a noble in each turn; that player could choose between the eligible nobles.
 Player gets to keep the Noble until the end of the game.
Noble tiles will not be replenished during the game.
 If player has more than 10 gems in possession, return enough gems to limit total count of gems in your possession to 10 or fewer.
 If a development card is purchased, the empty slot is replenished from the top card on the respective deck immediately. When the deck runs out, there are no more cards of that rank available, and the slot will stay empty.

End of game
When one player reaches 15 prestige points, the players continue playing the current round until each player has taken the same number of turns. Once this occurs, the game ends.

Scoring
Once the game ends, whoever has the most prestige points wins; in case of a tie, whoever purchased the fewest development cards wins. If this fails to break the tie, the player with fewest reserved cards wins. If all else fails, the players will then share the victory.

Reception
The game received positive reviews, with The Wirecutter stating that the game has a "balance of luck and intro-level strategy". Similarly, The Gaming Review praised its accessibility combined with reasonable strategy and the component quality, but criticised its theme, stating that "It’s a shame the theme doesn’t carry through better". Board Game Helv also gave a positive review, commending on the game's replayability, interaction and components.

Spin-offs

Expansion 
An expansion of the game, Cities of Splendor, was released in 2017, including four modules (The Cities, The Trading Posts, The Orient, The Strongholds). The Opinionated Gamers gave a positive review, describing the changes as subtle and varied.

Digital edition 
A mobile application version of the game, for iOS, Android and Steam, was published by Asmodee Digital.

Splendor Duel 
Released in 2022, Splendor Duel is a two-player only standalone game based on Splendor that retains some of the main gameplay mechanisms of that design.

Awards 
 2014 Dice Tower Gaming Awards Best Family Game, Winner
 2014 Golden Geek Best Board Game Artwork & Presentation, Nominee
 2014 Golden Geek Best Family Board Game, Winner
 2014 Golden Geek Board Game of the Year, Winner
 2014 Spiel des Jahres Game of the Year, Nominee
 2014 Tric Trac de Bronze
 2014 Origins Game of the Year
 2015 Golden Geek Best Board Game App

References

Board games introduced in 2014
Card games introduced in 2014
Board games about history
Origins Award winners